Eric Butorac and Rajeev Ram were the defending champions but decided not to participate.
Christopher Kas and Viktor Troicki won in the final against Jonathan Erlich and Jürgen Melzer 6–4, 6–4.

Seeds

Draw

Draw

References
 Main Draw

Doubles
PTT Thailand Open - Doubles
 in Thai tennis